Chris Andries (born 11 September 1959) is a Belgian football manager.

References

1959 births
Living people
Belgian football managers
K.R.C. Gent managers